Orren D. Casselman (November 3, 1861 – November 15, 1950) was an Ontario merchant and political figure. He represented Dundas in the House of Commons of Canada from 1917 to 1921 as a Unionist member.

He was born in Chesterville, Canada West, the son of James C. Casselman, and was educated in Morrisburg and Hamilton. He taught school for two years before opening a general store in Chesterville. In 1905, he married Alin Sanders. Casselman was a recruiting officer and served overseas during World War I. He was defeated in the 1921 general election.

His half-brother William H. Casselman served in the Ontario provincial assembly.

External links 

Stormont, Dundas and Glengarry : a history, 1784-1945, JG Harkness (1946)

1862 births
Members of the House of Commons of Canada from Ontario
Unionist Party (Canada) MPs
1950 deaths